Mana Motuhake may refer to:

 Mana Motuhake, a political party in New Zealand from 1980 to 2005
 Mana motuhake, a concept in Maori thought that is similar to the notion of sovereignty